Kıskıvrak is a 1986 Turkish adventure film, directed by Halit Refiğ and starring Tarık Akan, Gülsen Bubikoglu, and Korhan Abay.

References

External links
Kıskıvrak at the Internet Movie Database

1986 films
Turkish action adventure films
1980s action adventure films
Films directed by Halit Refiğ
Films about prostitution
Films about pornography
Cross-dressing in film